Germain Caron (March 12, 1910 – February 14, 1966) was a politician in Quebec, Canada and a six-term Member of the Legislative Assembly of Quebec (MLA).

Early life

He was born on March 12, 1910, in Louiseville, Mauricie and was an attorney.

Mayor of Louiseville

Caron served as Mayor of Louiseville from 1953 to 1961.

Member of the legislature

He ran as a Union Nationale candidate in the district of Maskinongé in the 1944 provincial election and won. He was re-elected in 1948 and won every subsequent election in 1952, 1956, 1960 and 1962.

He served as House Deputy Speaker from 1958 to 1960 and House Whip from 1959 until 1960.

Death

He died in office on February 14, 1966, in Montreal.

See also
Maskinongé Provincial Electoral District
Louiseville
Mauricie

References

1910 births
1966 deaths
Mayors of places in Quebec
Union Nationale (Quebec) MNAs
Vice Presidents of the National Assembly of Quebec
Université Laval alumni